Mesarfelta was a Roman–Berber town in the province of Numidia. It was also a bishopric that is included in the Catholic Church's list of titular sees.

History
The historic Mesarfelta is believed to be what are now the ruins of El-Outaïa or those of Tolga, Henchir-El-Ksar, or may be Qastilya in Algeria (according to "Three North-African Topographical Notes (Islamic-Roman)").

The city is believed to have been constructed as a fortification by the Romans (with annexed "vicus"), in the second half of the first century near the Aures Mountains. It had an amphitheatre during Hadrians reign.

A barrier called Fossatum Africae, which marked the frontier between the territory of the Roman Empire and other lands, ran through Mesarfelta.

The city disappeared after the Muslim conquest in the second half of the 7th century.

Bishopric
The city of Mesarfelta was the seat of an ancient bishopric There are two Mesarfelta bishops historically remembered both in the Council of Carthage (411).

Ancient bishops
"Lucianus"(Catholic) and "Bennatus"(Donatist).

Titular bishops of Mesarfelta
William Edward McManus  1967–1976
Louis-Albert Vachon 1977–1981
Basile Tapsoba 1981–1984
Joseph Paul Pierre Morissette  1987–1990
Michael Angelo Saltarelli 1990–1995
Antonio Menegazzo, M.C.C.I. 1995-2019

See also

 Mauretania Caesariensis
 Caesarea
 Thamugadi
 Lambaesis

References

Bibliography

 J. Baradez (1949). .   v. 93 p. 1-24.
 P. Trousset (2002).   v. 10, p. 143-150.

Archaeological sites in Algeria
Roman towns and cities in Algeria
Ancient Berber cities
Catholic titular sees in Africa
Populated places established in the 1st century
1st-century establishments in the Roman Empire